The Andrew C. Vaughn House, also known as the McCall House, is a circa 1873 Italianate style house in Franklin, Tennessee.

It was listed on the National Register of Historic Places in 1988.

According to a 1988 study of Williamson County historical resources, it is one of a handful of notable, historic Italianate style residences in the county, others being the James Wilhoite House, the John Hunter House, the Owen-Cox House, the Y.M. Rizer House (ca. 1875, a combination of Italianate and Second Empire design), the Henry Pointer House, the Jordan-Williams House, and the Thomas Critz House.

References

Houses on the National Register of Historic Places in Tennessee
Houses in Franklin, Tennessee
Italianate architecture in Tennessee
Houses completed in 1873
National Register of Historic Places in Williamson County, Tennessee